The Royal Hospital Haslar, formerly the Royal Naval Hospital Haslar, in Gosport, Hampshire, was one of several hospitals serving the local area. It was converted into retirement flats between 2018 and 2020. The hospital itself is a Grade II listed building.

History

Formation and operation
The Admiralty acquired the site selected for the hospital, Haslar Farm, whose name came from Anglo-Saxon Hæsel-ōra, in 1745. The building was designed by Theodore Jacobsen and construction of the main building was completed in on 23 October 1753. On completion it was the largest brick building in Europe. Building works cost more than £100,000, nearly double the cost of the Admiralty headquarters in London. In its early years it was known as the Royal Hospital Haslar.

Patients usually arrived by boat (it was not until 1795 that a bridge was built over Haslar Creek, providing a direct link to Gosport). Built on a peninsula, the guard towers, high brick walls, bars and railings throughout the site were all designed to stop patients, many of whom had been press ganged, from going absent without leave.

Dr James Lind (1716–1794), a leading physician at Haslar from 1758 till 1785, played a major part in discovering a cure for scurvy, not least through his pioneering use of a double blind methodology with Vitamin C supplements (limes). The hospital included an asylum for sailors with psychiatric disorders, and an early superintending psychiatrist was the phrenologist, Dr James Scott (1785–1859), a member of the influential Edinburgh Phrenological Society. The hospital treated casualties between 1803 and 1815 during the Napoleonic Wars.

The hospital established the country's first blood bank, treated casualties from the Normandy landings and deployed clinicians to field hospitals in Europe and in the Far East during the Second World War. It was renamed the Royal Naval Hospital Haslar to reflect its naval traditions in 1954.

The hospital's remit became tri-service in 1996 when it reverted to being called the Royal Hospital Haslar. A hyperbaric medicine unit was established at the hospital at that time. To mark the handover of control to the National Health Service in 2007, the military medical staff "marched out" of the hospital in 2007, exercising the unit's rights of the freedom of Gosport.

Closure 
All remaining medical facilities at the site were closed in 2009. After services were transferred to the Ministry of Defence Hospital Unit at Queen Alexandra Hospital in Cosham, Portsmouth, the hospital closed in 2009. The 25-hectare hospital site was sold to developers for £3 million later that year.

On 17 May 2010 an investigation of the hospital's burial ground, by archaeologists from Cranfield Forensic Institute, was featured on Channel 4's television programme Time Team. It established that a large number of individuals (calculated as approximately 7,785) had been buried in unmarked graves.

Plans were released in 2014 for a £152 million redevelopment scheme involving housing, commercial space, a retirement home and a hotel. The hospital was converted into retirement flats to the designs of Graham Reid Architects and Heber-Percy and Parker Architects between 2018 and 2020.

Gallery

See also
 List of hospitals in England

References

Bibliography

External links 
Haslar Heritage Group

Buildings and structures completed in 1753
Defunct hospitals in England
Gosport
History of Hampshire
Hospital buildings completed in the 18th century
Hospitals disestablished in 2009
Hospitals in Hampshire
Military history of Hampshire
Military hospitals in the United Kingdom
Royal Navy Medical Service
1753 establishments in England
2009 disestablishments in England